Whenever may refer to:

Music

Albums
 Whenever, a 2004 album by When
 Whenever (Atmosphere album), 2019
 Whenever, a 2017 album by Sbfive

Songs
 "Whenever" (song), 2018 song by Kris Kross Amsterdam and The Boy Next Door featuring Conor Maynard
 "Whenever", a song by Beth Orton from the 1996 album Trailer Park
 "Whenever", a song by Black Eyed Peas from the 2010 album The Beginning
 "Whenever", a song by Jacques Greene from the 2019 album Dawn Chorus

Other uses
 Whenever (play), a 2000 children's musical play with words by Alan Ayckbourn and music by Denis King

See also